Ceradryops punctatus, is a species of long-toed water beetle found in Sri Lanka.

Antennae with five-segments or antennomeres.

References 

Dytiscidae
Insects of Sri Lanka
Insects described in 1937